Nord-Odal is a municipality in Innlandet county, Norway. It is located in the traditional district of Odalen. The administrative centre of the municipality is the village of Sand. Other villages in the municipality include Knapper and Mo.

The  municipality is the 209th largest by area out of the 356 municipalities in Norway. Nord-Odal is the 182nd most populous municipality in Norway with a population of 5,016.

General information
The parish of Nordre Odalen was established as a municipality on 1 January 1838 (see formannskapsdistrikt law). The borders of the municipality have not changed since that time.

Name
The municipality is named after the valley in which it is located. The last element is the old district name Odalen. The prefix "Nord-" was added when the old Odalen parish was divided in 1819 into Søndre Odalen in the south and Nordre Odalen in the north. Later, spelling reforms changed the names to Nord-Odal and Sør-Odal.

Coat of arms
The coat of arms was granted on 10 January 1992. The arms show two black grapple tools on a gold background. They represent the historic traditions of forestry and logging in the municipality.

Churches
The Church of Norway has two parishes within the municipality of Nord-Odal. It is part of the Solør, Vinger og Odal prosti (deanery) in the Diocese of Hamar.

Government
All municipalities in Norway, including Nord-Odal, are responsible for primary education (through 10th grade), outpatient health services, senior citizen services, unemployment and other social services, zoning, economic development, and municipal roads. The municipality is governed by a municipal council of elected representatives, which in turn elects a mayor.  The municipality falls under the Romerike og Glåmdal District Court and the Eidsivating Court of Appeal.

Municipal council
The municipal council  of Nord-Odal is made up of 25 representatives that are elected to four year terms. The party breakdown of the council is as follows:

Geography

Nord-Odal is situated in the Odalen valley around the northern edge of the lake Storsjøen and around the lake Råsen. The municipality is bordered to the north by the municipality of Stange, to the east by the municipalities of Åsnes and Grue, to the south by the municipalities of Sør-Odal and Nes, and to the west by the municipality of Eidsvoll.

Notable residents

 Honoratus Halling (1819 in Odalen – 1886) a priest, magazine editor and non-fiction writer
 Jon Hol (1851 at Ekornhol – 1941) a Norwegian engineer and political activist
 Harald Stormoen (1872 in Nord-Odal – 1937) a Norwegian actor 
 Andreas Hofgaard Winsnes (1889 in Nord-Odal – 1972) a literary historian and educator
 Sigurd Hoel (1890 in Nord-Odal – 1960) a Norwegian author and publishing consultant
 Marit Nybakk (born 1947 in Nord-Odal) a Norwegian politician of the Third Way
 Einar Olav Skogholt (born 1947 in Nord-Odal) a politician and Mayor of Nord-Odal in the 1970s 
 Lasse Sætre (born 1974 in Sand) a former speed skater, bronze medallist at the 2002 Winter Olympics 
 Jan Werner Danielsen (1976 in Nord-Odal – 2006) a Norwegian pop singer
 Lise Selnes (born 1976), mayor in Nord-Odal 2011–2021, and member of the Storting.

Media gallery

References

External links

Municipal fact sheet from Statistics Norway 

 
Municipalities of Innlandet
1838 establishments in Norway